There are more than 130 named rivers and streams in the traditional County Dublin, Ireland, which comprises the city of Dublin and the surrounding counties of Dún Laoghaire–Rathdown, Fingal and South Dublin.

Rivers and tributaries
The rivers and streams are listed in one table, with systems such as the Liffey (and that of its major sub-system, the Dodder), Broadmeadow, Tolka and Shanganagh identified within the table. The name of each watercourse, the location of its mouth or confluence point and whether, for tributaries, they enter their parent on the right or left bank, is noted. Unnamed tributaries are not included. Most are shown on the back cover map of the Doyle reference, and those in the central area are shown on the main and section-specific maps in the Sweeney reference.

References

Bibliography

See also
 Rivers of Ireland
 List of rivers in Ireland
 List of Dublin bridges and tunnels

 List
Rivers, Dublin
Drainage basins of County Dublin
County Dublin-related lists